Panonychus ulmi, the European red mite, is a species of mite which is a major agricultural pest of fruit trees. It has a high reproductive rate, a short generation time (21 days at ) and produces many broods in a year, all of which contribute to its pest status. It has a cosmopolitan distribution, and a very wide host range, having been found on the following plants:

Acacia longifolia
Aesculus hippocastanum
Alnus glutinosa
Alnus incana
Amaranthus
Amelanchier
Artocarpus heterophyllus
Atropa belladonna
Avena sativa
Betula pubescens
Betula verrucosa
Calystegia sepium
Camellia sinensis
Castanea sativa
Chenopodium
Citrus aurantiifolia
Citrus aurantium
Citrus grandis
Convolvulus arvensis
Corylus avellana
Cotoneaster tomentosus
Crataegus monogyna
Crataegus succulenta
Cucumis
Cucurbita maxima
Cucurbita pepo
Cydonia oblonga
Dalbergia sissoo
Daucus carota
Desmodium canescens
Diospyros
Eriobotrya japonica
Fagus sylvatica
Ficus carica
Fragaria vesca
Frangula alnus
Fraxinus excelsior
Gardenia jasminoides
Hibiscus
Hydrangea macrophylla
Juglans regia
Juncus maritimus
Laburnum alpinum
Lonicera japonica
Malus domestica
Malva
Medicago sativa
Morus nigra
Myrica pensylvanica
Petroselinum crispum
Phaseolus
Phlox
Polygonum aviculare
Populus tremula
Potentilla fruticosa
Prunus americana
Prunus armeniaca
Prunus avium
Prunus cerasus
Prunus chinensis
Prunus divaricata
Prunus domestica
Prunus dulcis
Prunus institia
Prunus padus
Prunus persica
Prunus spinosa
Pyracantha
Pyrus baccata
Pyrus communis
Pyrus pyrifolia
Pyrus sargentii
Quercus
Rhamnus frangula
Ribes aureum
Ribes sanguineum
Robinia pseudoacacia
Rosa canina
Rosa multiflora
Rosa palustris
Rubus idaeus
Rubus occidentalis
Rumex obtusifolius
Salix alba
Salix caprea
Sapindus saponaria
Sasa kurilensis
Sophora japonica
Sorbus aria
Sorbus aucuparia
Sorbus chrysophylla
Sorbus conradina
Sorbus fennica
Sorbus hostii
Sorbus scandica
Sorghum halepense
Symphoricarpos foetidus
Syzygium
Tilia cordata
Trifolium pratense
Triticum aestivum
Ulmus americana
Ulmus campestris
Ulmus glabra
Ulmus hollandica
Ulmus procera
Ulmus rubra
Ulmus scabra
Vicia sativa
Vitis labrusca
Vitis vinifera
Wisteria sinensis
Zea mays

Panonychus ulmi was first described by Carl Ludwig Koch in 1836, under the name Tetranychus ulmi. It has also been known under a number of synonyms:

Tetranychus ulmi Koch, 1836
Oligonychus ulmi : Hirst, 1920
Metatetranychus ulmi : Oudemans, 1931
Paratetranychus ulmi : André, 1937
Panonychus ulmi : Ehara, 1956
Tetranychus pilosus Canestrini & Fanzago, 1876
Paratetranychus pilosus : Zacher, 1913
Metatetranychus pilosus : Oudemans, 1931
Paratetranychus pilosus alboguttatus Zacher, 1913
Tetranychus alboguttatus Zacher, 1913
Metetetranychus alboguttatus : Oudemans, 1931
Paratetranychus pilosus occidentalis McGregor & Newcomer, 1928
Oligonychus alni Oudemans, 1929
Metatetranychus alni : Oudemans, 1931
Oligonychus muscorum Oudemans, 1929
Metatetranychus muscorum : Oudemans, 1931
Oligonychus potentillae Oudemans, 1929
Metatetranychus potentillae : Oudemans, 1931
Metatetranychus mali Oudemans, 1931
Metatetranychus canestrinii Oudemans, 1939

References

Trombidiformes
Agricultural pest mites
Animals described in 1836